The Socialist is the official newspaper of the Socialist Party in Ireland. Published once a month, it is also available online.

The newspaper first appeared intermittently in the early 1990s following the expulsion of members of Militant tendency from the Labour Party. The grouping became known as Militant Labour and later, the Socialist Party.

The paper describes itself as providing a unique socialist analysis of political events. It frequently covers workers rights, human rights trade union issues along with international affairs and political commentary.

See also
 The Starry Plough

References
 Socialist Party

Monthly newspapers
Newspapers published in the Republic of Ireland
Socialist newspapers
Newspaper